Orellia scorzonerae is a species of tephritid or fruit flies in the genus Orellia of the family Tephritidae.

Distribution
Italy.

References

Tephritinae
Insects described in 1830
Diptera of Europe